The Inner Circle is a 1912 American silent drama film directed by D. W. Griffith, starring Mary Pickford and Blanche Sweet. A print of the short survives in the film archive of the Library of Congress.

Cast
 Adolph Lestina as The Widower
 Jack Pickford as The Messenger
 J. Jiquel Lanoe as The Rich Italian
 Mary Pickford as The Rich Italian's Daughter
 Charles Hill Mailes as A Gangster
 Joseph McDermott as Police Agent
 Alfred Paget as Police Agent
 W. Christy Cabanne as In Gang
 Donald Crisp
 Gladys Egan
 Charles Gorman as Accident Witness
 Robert Harron as In Crowd / Accident Witness
 Mae Marsh
 Baden Powell
 Blanche Sweet
 Kate Toncray as In Crowd
 Henry B. Walthall
 Charles West

See also
 D. W. Griffith filmography
 Mary Pickford filmography
 Blanche Sweet filmography

References

External links

1912 films
1912 short films
American silent short films
American black-and-white films
1912 drama films
Surviving American silent films
Films directed by D. W. Griffith
Silent American drama films
1910s American films